, originally titled , is a light novel series written by Fuyumi Ono. It follows the adventures of Shibuya Psychic Research as they investigate mysterious occurrences all over Japan with a team of other spiritualists and clever assistants. Although the last novel was published in 1994, the story was left incomplete.

The novels were adapted into a radio drama for Akuryō Series in 1997. A manga adaptation written and illustrated by Shiho Inada began serialization in Nakayoshi in the July 7, 1998 issue and ended on the September 30, 2010 issue. The individual chapters have been collected and published in twelve tankōbon volumes by Kodansha. It is licensed for English-language release, under the name Ghost Hunt in North America by Del Rey Manga and in the United Kingdom by Tanoshimi.  An anime television series adaptation of the manga was animated by J.C.Staff and premiered on October 3, 2006 in Japan on TV Tokyo where it ran for twenty-five episodes until its conclusion. The anime is licensed for English release on Region 1 DVD by Funimation Entertainment, which also uses the name Ghost Hunt.

Plot
Ghost Hunt follows the ghost hunting adventures of Mai Taniyama, a first-year high school student who becomes involved with Shibuya Psychic Research (SPR) and its young manager, Kazuya Shibuya. Mai nicknames Kazuya Shibuya "Naru" because of his  attitude, and the nickname is generally adopted by all those who come to eventually work with SPR: Buddhist monk Houshou Takigawa; shrine maiden Ayako Matsuzaki; celebrity teen psychic Masako Hara; and Catholic priest John Brown.

Ghost Hunt also explores the paranormal abilities of the characters, particularly focusing on Mai's "latent psychic abilities," demonstrated by her dreaming about information relevant to their cases. She is often joined in her dreams by someone whom she assumes to be Naru, who acts as a spirit guide, but who is later revealed to be Naru's dead twin brother who had died long before.

Characters
  is a 16-year-old first-year high school student who becomes involved with Shibuya Psychic Research (SPR) after she accidentally breaks an expensive video camera that was being used by the SPR in an investigation of an old building at her school.  In the same incident, she is saved from a falling bookcase by Lin Koujo, who is injured instead. To repay her debt, she fills in for Lin to assist SPR's manager Kazuya Shibuya. After the conclusion of the first case, she is offered a paycheck for her work and a part-time position at SPR.  As the series progresses, it is revealed that Mai has ESP abilities, which include postcognitive dreams and clairvoyance. Mai also demonstrates an instance of astral projection, when she gives Masako a key to comfort her after she is kidnapped by Urado and his men. As she is still unfamiliar with her newly discovered powers, Mai is often not confident in her abilities and often does not disclose the full details of her dreams, where someone that resembles Naru frequently appears and guides her. The other members of the SPR teach her some useful techniques, which she utilizes in the series. She develops feelings for Naru as well as the other 'Naru' who appears in her dreams. 
  is a 17-year-old paranormal researcher and manager of Shibuya Psychic Research. Mai nicknames him "Naru" for his  attitude; this nickname generally comes to be adopted by their colleagues. Though appearing cold and critical in front of his friends, he does care for them deeply and earns their trust and respect. Initially, it appears that he has no spiritual powers. However, later it is revealed that Naru is actually the famed paranormal researcher and psychic, Oliver Davis, and that he has very strong psychokinetic abilities, which Masako Hara has witnessed.  Although Naru has been taught how to manage his psychic abilities by Lin Koujo, it takes such a large toll on his body that the one time he does use it in the series, he collapses and is hospitalized. It is also revealed that Naru had a twin brother named Eugene (that Mai sees in her dreams as "dream Naru"), who originally helped Naru to control his abilities. They were nicknamed Gene and Noll; when Mai gives him the nickname Naru ('Na-ru'), he is taken aback because (in Japanese) it sounds similar to Noll ('No-ru'). Naru and his brother were orphans who were later adopted by the Davis's, paranormal researchers in England. Naru learns that his brother has died, and using psychometry, is led to Japan. It is discovered that Gene was run over by a car driven by an unknown woman, and his body was thrown into a lake to destroy any evidence of the accident. Mai Taniyama is his love interest as the author has confirmed that they would eventually become a couple, though she states that she has no interest in writing such a story. The original author Fuyumi Ono stated almost as if apologetically to her fans that she 'does not do happy endings'.   
 , originally from Hong Kong, is Naru's solemn and taciturn assistant. He seems to get most of the unpleasant jobs, and works through the night. He appears to be a strong onmyoji and has a wide range of paranormal skills from exorcism to summoning spirits that he has captured and can then control familiars. He acts as Naru's guardian to help him find his brother. It is revealed that the three are childhood friends. It was Lin who taught Kazuya how to control the enormous energy that Kazuya has had since birth. Lin says he dislikes Japanese people because of the past conflicts Japan has had with China. At one time, he told this to Mai and she told him that he should forget the past to move on and if he should hate her, it should be because he hates her as an individual. At this, he stated that a long time ago, someone told him exactly the same words. In the novels, it is revealed that this person was Gene. 
  is a 25-year-old hakkaisou, a Buddhist monk who has left his position at the headquarters of the Koyasan Shingon sect of Japanese Buddhism, Mt. Koya. He says he "came down from the mountain" and has grown his hair out, has pierced ears, and wears fashionable clothing. He claims that he left because they did not allow music CDs; his day job is playing bass guitar in a popular local band. He is one of the more powerful and effective members of the group and takes the lead in Naru's absence, as seen in the Cursed House File. The other members of SPR refer to him casually as "Monk". He is also very protective of Mai and acts like an older brother to her, even teaching her some Buddhist warding chants. 
  is an outspoken 23-year-old self-styled shrine maiden ("self-styled" because she was not raised in a shrine; in fact, she is the daughter of wealthy doctors who own a community general hospital). She is confident and proud of her abilities, though her attempts to demonstrate them have almost always fallen short. She does teach Mai some defensive sutras and it is later revealed that her powers only work when she is around living trees as she draws power from the spirits in them. As a child, the spirit from a large tree in front of her house taught her much of what she knows now. Being near such trees allows her to purify disquiet spirits through a particular Shinto ritual. This makes her a unique kind of priestess as she performs her rituals not in a shrine but anywhere that has trees nearby. However, she has to let the spirits from the trees to rest for six months after she uses them. 
  is a 19-year-old Caucasian Catholic priest from Australia who speaks Japanese with a Kansai (Australian in the English dub) accent. Good-natured and helpful, he helps Mai and Naru however he can. His means of exorcism is spraying holy water while reciting the first passage of John from the New Testament of the Bible. In most cases SPR relies on John's exorcisms whenever a human being is possessed by a spirit. In "The Cursed House" File, it is revealed that John's exorcisms, unlike Hosho's Buddhist Mantras or Ayako's Shinto Kuji, do not cause physical harm when used on a possessed living creature. 
  is a 16-year-old spirit medium who stars in a popular television show; she has the ability to channel the deceased. Aside from Mai, she is the only one who can sense spirits and their natures. Because she is always wearing a kimono, even while sleeping, she is remarked as resembling a Japanese doll. She has romantic feelings towards Naru and often gets jealous over Naru's treatment of Mai resulting in the two girls considering each other rivals. After Mai saves her in the "Blood-stained Labyrinth," they reach a shaky truce. In personality, she is often serious and condescending towards Ayako and Mai. However, this is most probably because she viewed Ayako and Mai as rivals for Naru. In the novels, it is revealed that Masako knows of Naru's true identity and his psychic powers and has used that secret to extract favors out of Naru himself, despite his reluctance to participate in social events. 
  is a third-year top-ranked high school student and president of his school's student council. Yasuhara first appears as a client of SPR as a result of unexplainable phenomena occurring at his school. After the case is solved, he continues to help out SPR on other cases, including standing in as "Kazuya Shibuya" at the request of Naru and performing background research off-site while the others are on a case. He has no psychic powers of his own, but his sharp mind and work efficiency make him a great help to the team. In the Cursed House arc, he was called to research the folklore of the surrounding areas and was able to determine the source of all the spirits being manipulated to kill the family. He has an unorthodox sense of humor that usually consists of telling convoluted lies that creep out or irritates the other party. He does it mostly to people who tease or are rude to him. He refers to it as "being a jerk to a jerk". He also does not scare easily as demonstrated when he was not afraid of reversing the curse on him and the rest of the students in his school in the Forbidden Pastimes arc. 
  is an associate and mentor to Naru, who requests the SPR to investigate the mysterious disappearances of two young people at the estate of a former Prime Minister.  However, it is revealed that she actually wanted the SPR to expose another investigator at the estate (posing as "Oliver Davis") as an impostor. She aided in the case by researching the house and the inhabitants for SPR. She enjoys frequently teasing Naru and also knows the secret reason for his being in Japan.

Secondary Characters & Victims
  is Mai's best friend and classmate from school, she along with Mai and Keiko enjoy telling each other ghost stories after school. 
  is Mai's other friend  from school. 
  is the class-president and another classmate of Mai Taniyama, in episode 3 she is revealed to be a latent psychic however she wasn't aware that she had supernatural abilities until Kazuya told her this. 
  is a young girl, eight years old, who appears in the episode The Doll House in this episode she was experiencing strange behavior after her father had remarried which was caused by her toy doll  who hypnotized her into believing that her new mother is "a witch" and that her father is "her assistant". According to Ayami every time she would play or make friends with other children, Minnie would often punish her-(by moving the bedroom furniture) as a result. 
  is Ayami's aunt and caregiver while her brother Ayami's father is overseas on a business trip.
  is a young man whose family lives all the way near the seaside, he came to the SPR team to show them a mysterious rash on his niece Hazuki's back and neck; the actual cause was because of "Kaimyo" a spiritual name for the dead, however it wasn't just Hazuki and her cousins that were cursed it was the entire Yoshimi family, according to Taizo every time there's a new head of the family strange things start happening. 
  is Akifumi's niece, she arrived with her uncle (who is also her legal guardian) and was shown to possess ugly looking marks all over her body which he believed was an infection and took her to the hospital for a check up; but it turns out Hazuki got the rash after her grandfather died which began the curse. The marks on her body disappear after the curse had been lifted.  
  is Hazuki older brother, after he gets possessed he tries to commit suicide but likely Mai uses her spiritual powers to release the spirit within him and his cousin Wakako but her abilities end up injuring the children in the process. 
  is the new head of the Yoshimi family after his father-in law had recently died. According to him, every time there is a new head in their family; strange horrible things begin happening. 
  is Taizo's wife who just like Masako is always seen wearing a kimono. 32 years before the series, her grandfather died along with eight other family members; after that five of her mother's siblings also died from unknown causes and was the only one who had survived. Then the day after her father's funeral when he also died, is when her own granddaughter Hazuki had the scars on her body and with the scar on Hazuki neck it's like her father's ghost wants to kill his grandchild from beyond the grave.  
  is one of Hazuki and Katsuki's cousins, when she and Katsuki were possessed the two of them would be seen walking together and saying weird things.

Media

Light novels

Akuryō Series

Ghost Hunt Series (White Heart Series)

Manga

Written and illustrated by Shiho Inada, the manga adaptation premiered in Amie magazine in 1998, then moved to sister publication Nakayoshi. After this, the series moved to being published in volumes only. The series was completed in September 2010 with the twelfth and final volume.  The manga was licensed for an English-language release in North America by Del Rey Manga, which had released eleven volumes of the series. Ghost Hunt is licensed for release in the United Kingdom by Tanoshimi.

Anime

An anime television series adaptation of the manga was animated by  J.C.Staff. It premiered on October 3, 2006 in Japan on TV Tokyo where it ran for twenty-five episodes until its conclusion. The anime is licensed for English release on Region 1 DVD by Funimation Entertainment, which released the entire series across two 2-disc volumes, and later in a single box set.

Live action film
In November 2013, production companies Twins Japan and Kadokawa Shoten announced that a live action film adaptation of Ghost Hunt was in production. The film will be directed by Yoshitaka Yamaguchi with Atsuyuki Shimoda and Shotaro Oikawa writing the screenplay. Shinichiro Inoue will serve as executive producer, and Adrian Chaw will serve as co-executive producer. The film will star Maya Fukuzawa as Mai Taniyama, Mizuki Yamamoto as Masako Hara, and Yosuke Kamamura as Hōshō Takigawa. Additional casting has yet to be announced. The film was slated for a summer 2014 release, but no announcement has been made since.

Reception
Pop Culture Shock's Michelle Smith criticises the Ghost Hunt manga for its "noticeable slide in quality" after volume five, attributing this to "the end of Ghost Hunts serialization in Nakayoshi and the beginning of direct-to-tankōban releases". Mania.com's Eduardo M. Chavez criticises the main protagonist, Naru, for not taking "action on initial calls for distress. He then changes his mind, takes the case while always providing a perspective that is contrary to the work that he is actually assigning his staff." He also criticises the repetitive nature of the manga, saying, "every bit of paranormal, psychic and occult culture is dissected to death often repeating a few times a book".

ActiveAnime's Sandra Scholes commends the anime for having "the feel of a well-known supernatural TV series with its roots deep in Japanese mythology and history." Anime News Network's Theron Martin commends the anime for its "excellent pacing, offers good entertainment value, sometimes genuinely intense and horrifying" however, he criticises it for "lax characterizations" and oversimplifying some things. DVD Talk's John Sinnott compares the anime to Case Closed with a supernatural twist. He also stated within his final thoughts that he "was initially disappointed, the show did turn out to be an enjoyable mystery show with some fun and intriguing characters".

Notes

References

Further reading

External links
 Official Kodansha Ghost Hunt website 
 Official TV Tokyo Ghost Hunt anime website 
 Official Funimation Ghost Hunt anime website
 

Book series introduced in 1989
1989 Japanese novels
1994 Japanese novels
1998 manga
2006 anime television series debuts
2007 Japanese television series endings
Anime and manga based on light novels
Del Rey Manga
Novels about exorcism
Fiction about urban legends
Fuyumi Ono
Funimation
J.C.Staff
Kodansha books
Kodansha manga
Light novels
Occult detective anime and manga
School life in anime and manga
Shōjo manga
Supernatural anime and manga
Television shows based on light novels
TV Tokyo original programming
Yōkai in anime and manga